Pushabad (also Romanized as Pūshābād) is a village in Haq Rural District, Nalus District, Oshnavieh County, West Azerbaijan Province, Iran. At the 2006 census, its population was 277, in 48 families.

References 

Populated places in Oshnavieh County